Eva-Maria Elisabeth Feichtner (born 1972) is a German mathematician, the founder and director of the Institute for Algebra, Geometry, Topology and their Applications at the University of Bremen, where she is professor of algebra and vice president of internationalization and diversity.
Topics in her research have included tropical geometry, matroid polytopes, Chow rings, toric varieties, lattices and semilattices, and the wonderful compactification.

Education and career
Feichtner earned a diploma in mathematics in 1994 at the Free University of Berlin, and a Ph.D. in 1997 at the Technical University of Berlin. Her dissertation, Cohomology Algebras of Subspace Arrangements and of Classical Configuration Spaces, was supervised by Günter M. Ziegler. She completed her habilitation in 2004 at the Technical University of Berlin.

After postdoctoral research at the Massachusetts Institute of Technology and Institute for Advanced Study, she became an assistant professor at ETH Zurich in 1999, and a research professor at ETH Zurich in 2005. She moved to the University of Stuttgart in 2006 as professor of geometry and topology, and to the University of Bremen in 2007 as professor of algebra.
She became vice president of internationalization and diversity at the University of Bremen in 2017, succeeding .

References

External links
Home page

1972 births
Living people
20th-century German mathematicians
German women mathematicians
Free University of Berlin alumni
Technical University of Berlin alumni
Academic staff of ETH Zurich
Academic staff of the University of Stuttgart
Academic staff of the University of Bremen
20th-century German women